The 2012 CIS Men's University Cup Hockey Tournament (50th Annual) was held March 22–25, 2012. This event marked the 50th anniversary of the inception of the University Cup tournament to decide the Men's University Hockey Champion. It is the second of two consecutive CIS Championships to be held at the University of New Brunswick's Aitken University Centre before moving to Credit Union Centre in Saskatoon for two years (hosted by the University of Saskatchewan.

The defending champions were the UNB Varsity Reds, who won their 4th title in fourteen years and who return to the tournament with a record of 20-5-3 in CIS play. They were joined by three qualifiers, a designated host team and one wild cards for a total of six(6) teams.

Similar to previous years, going back to the introduction of the expanded format in 1998, the teams are split into two(2) Pools of three teams where each team plays the other two teams. The best team in each Pool advances to the final. All pool games must be decided by a win, there are no ties. If a pool has a three-way tie for 1st (all teams have 1-1 records) than GF/GA differential among the tied teams is the first tie-breaker.

Road to the Cup

AUS playoffs

OUA Playoffs

Canada West playoffs

University Cup 
The six teams to advance to the tournament are listed below. The wild-card team was selected from the OUA Conference as the CW was provided the wild-card in 2011 and AUS teams are ineligible as they are the host conference.

Pool A - Evening

Pool B - Afternoon

 McGill Redmen advance to the Gold Medal final based on the first tie-breaker of having the best GF/GA Differential of +2.

Note: McGill becomes the 3rd team to advance to the Championship Final with a 1-1 record (Alberta-2008 & Western-2009).

Championship final
Bench assignments for the championship finals is based on the each advancing team's record and stats from their 2 pool games, not their tournament seed. Western was determined to be the home team with a record of 2-0 versus McGill at 1-1.

Tournament All-Stars
Francis Verreault-Paul, from the McGill Redmen, was selected as the Major W.J. 'Danny' McLeod Award for CIS University Cup MVP despite receiving a 5-minute Major and Game Misconduct in the 3rd period of the Championship final (charging Western Mustangs' goalie, Josh Unice, on a partial break-away), Verreault-Paul was McGill's MVP in their two pool games and was second in tournament goals (3) and tied for 2nd in points (5).

Joining Verreault-Paul on the tournament all-star team were:
Forward: Alexandre Picard-Hooper (McGill Redmen)
Forward: Keaton Turkiewicz (Western Mustangs)
Defenseman: Jonathan Harty (UNB Varsity Reds)
Defenseman: Marc-André Dorion (McGill Redmen)
Goalie: Josh Unice (Western Mustangs)

References

External links
 Tournament Website

U Sports ice hockey
University Cup, 2012